Senator Emery may refer to:

Ed Emery (politician) (1950–2021), Missouri State Senate
Jim Emery (born 1934), South Dakota State Senate
Lucilius A. Emery (1840–1920), Maine State Senate